Bombo Military Hospital is the largest military hospital in Uganda.The hospital is known for its specialized doctors and equipment. It also serves civilians from the districts of Luweero, Wakiso, Kampala, and Mukono.

Location

The geographical coordinates of Bombo Military Hospital are 0°35'11.0"N, 32°32'10.0"E (Latitude:0.586389; Longitude:32.536111).

Overview
The hospital is a military hospital that serves as a referral center for the various health units within the UPDF. However, because of the severe need from the surrounding community, the hospital attends to civilians from the surrounding communities. Beginning in September 2012, the hospital has been collaborating with Makerere University Walter Reed Project to improve laboratory services at the hospital.

Target population
The hospital serves the population of Bombo Military Barracks. It also handles patient referrals from other UPDF health units in the country. Because of severe need within the community, exacerbated by the ongoing repairs to Mulago National Referral Hospital, Bombo Military Hospital attends to civilian patients from the surrounding community. In 2014, the hospital attended to 2,145 baby deliveries, averaging nearly 6 new babies daily, with the case load expected to increase in 2015.

See also
List of hospitals in Uganda

References

External links
 Government To Construct Shs100 Billion Military Hospital At Mbuya

Bombo Military Hospital
Luweero District
Central Region, Uganda
Hospitals established in 1986
1986 establishments in Uganda